Albert cloth is a heavy woollen material with different colors or patterns on either side. The cloth had alternative names such as "plaid-back coverts" and "golf cloth". Albert cloth is a double weave fabric, made using a method of weaving in which two layers of fabric are woven simultaneously. It was a reversible, warm material, and useful for overcoats and cloaks.

See also 

 Biretz

References 

Textiles